Homer J. Lenderman, Jr. (born August 15, 1956, in Paragould, Arkansas), is an American politician and a Democratic former member of the Arkansas House of Representatives for District 53 from 2013 to 2015. Lenderman also served from January 2011 until January 2013 in  District 76.

Education
Lenderman earned his bachelor's degree and master's degree in agriculture from Arkansas State University in Jonesboro.

Elections
2012 Redistricted to District 53, and with Representative Keith Ingram running for Arkansas Senate, Lenderman was unopposed for both the May 22, 2012 Democratic Primary and the November 6, 2012 General election.
2010 When District 76 Representative Ray Kidd left the Legislature and left the seat open, Lenderman placed first in the three-way May 18, 2010 Democratic Primary with 1,501 votes (42.6%), won the June 8 runoff election with 1,740 votes (56.2%), and won the November 2, 2010 General election with 3,965 votes (57.6%) against Republican nominee Jim Martin.

References

External links
Official page at the Arkansas House of Representatives

Homer Lenderman at Ballotpedia
Homer Lenderman at the National Institute on Money in State Politics

1956 births
Living people
Arkansas State University alumni
Democratic Party members of the Arkansas House of Representatives
People from Craighead County, Arkansas